James Buller (9 November 1772 -  14 November 1830) was a British politician and Member of Parliament for West Looe between 1802 and 1805 and a further term between 1806 and 1812.

Early life 
Buller was educated at University of Westminster and the Inner Temple, being called to the bar in 1795. He married his wife Mary on 23 June 1795. Buller served as a Commissioner of Bankruptcy between  until 1807.

Parliamentary career 

Buller was elected as the MP for West Looe at the 1802 general election, standing down in 1805 to allow Ralph Daniell to take a seat. In 1806, he re-stood for the seat taking over from Quintin Dick.

Following his leaving Parliament, Buller served as the Clerk in Ordinary to the Privy Council from January 1812 until his death in 1830.

Personal life 
James Buller was the third son of John Buller, coming from the Buller family with long ties to Parliament.

References 

1772 births
1830 deaths
Buller family
UK MPs 1802–1806
UK MPs 1806–1807
UK MPs 1807–1812
Alumni of the University of Westminster
Members of the Inner Temple
Lords of the Admiralty